Helmut Kapitulski (born 29 September 1934) is a former German footballer.

References

External links
 
 

1934 births
Living people
Footballers from Dortmund
German footballers
Borussia Dortmund players
Bundesliga players
1. FC Kaiserslautern players
Germany international footballers
Association football midfielders
FK Pirmasens players